I Like to Watch is a 2019 American web series hosted by drag queens Trixie Mattel and Katya Zamolodchikova. The series was created by Netflix, and streams on the company's YouTube channel. I Like to Watch films its hosts as they view and react to various Netflix Original Programming and licensed films streaming on Netflix. The first season aired from November 21, 2019 to March 21, 2020. A second season, recorded in the duo's homes during the COVID-19 pandemic, premiered on May 23, 2020. The third season, still recorded from home but with the hosts together in person before moving to a new set, premiered on February 20, 2021. The series won a People's Voice Webby Award in 2022. In 2023 the series won a Bronze Anthem Award in the Awareness & Media categories for Diversity, Equity & Inclusion.

Episodes

Season 1 (2019–20)

Season 2 (2020–21)

Season 3 (2021)

Season 4 (2022)

Season 5 (2023)

Development and release
I Like to Watch was created for Netflix's queer social channel "Most". Mattel and Zamolodchikova first appeared together as contestants on the seventh season of RuPaul's Drag Race and would go on to jointly appear in a range of projects, including the web series UNHhhh and The Trixie & Katya Show. The series was first teased on Mattel's Instagram on November 20, 2019, with the first episode of the series released the subsequent day.

Reception
I Like to Watch was positively received by critics, with a review of the first episode for Pajiba noting that "when Trixie and Katya join forces, it's a blend of whimsy, wackiness, and raunch so intoxicating it feels like downing a pair of Absolut Vodka cocktails." The series was also positively reviewed by Out, PinkNews, and NewNowNext. The New York Times cited I Like to Watch as an example of a reality television series that "offer[s] gentle escapism in a genre better known for manipulating participants for entertainment." The Times further noted the similarities between the series and the Channel 4 series Gogglebox, describing I Like to Watch as "extremely reminiscent of Gogglebox, but with more glamour." A representative for Netflix responded that the network would "let the work speak for itself."

Awards and nominations

Celebrity Appearances

In the episode featuring Trixie and Katya watching My Best Friend's Wedding, the 90’s rom com classic, one of the film’s stars Rupert Everett says hello. When watching the Twilight Saga, Elvira addresses Katya and a skeleton Trixie. Lindsay Lohan greets Trixie and Katya before they watch her holiday film Falling For Christmas. Megan Thee Stallion, while having no affiliation with Wednesday the series, greets Trixie and Katya before they watch the show. Stars of Heartstopper Kit Connor and Joe Locke, asked Trixie and Katya on social media to watch their series and "do their worst" and surprise Trixie and Katya with a greeting asking for the same.

I Like to Watch UK
A British version of the show, I Like to Watch UK, premiered on Netflix UK & Ireland's YouTube channel on March 25, 2020. It features The Vivienne from the first series of RuPaul's Drag Race UK in a similar format to the American version, joined by various guests. So far the series has also featured fellow RuPaul's Drag Race UK stars Baga Chipz, Cheryl Hole, Lawrence Chaney and Tia Kofi, as well as RuPaul's Drag Race All Stars winner Monét X Change, and television personality Kim Woodburn. A special 'on tour' edition of I Like to Watch UK featuring Tia Kofi & Layla Zee Susan, Blu Hydrangea & Gypsy Divine, and Cheryl Hole & Stacey Rhect premiered on New Year's Eve 2021 (regular host The Vivienne did not appear in this episode).

Episodes

Notes

References

2019 web series debuts
American comedy web series
American LGBT-related web series
English-language Netflix original programming
Webby Award winners